KING is an Indonesian movie released in 2009, that tells about the dream of a village boy named Guntur (Rangga Raditya) to become an international badminton player. The film starred Rangga Raditya, Lucky Martin, Surya Saputra, Mamiek Prakoso, Valerie Thomas, Jonatan Christie, and Kevin Sanjaya. The film is the first film about badminton in the world.

Synopsis
The film tells about the dream of a village boy named Guntur (Rangga Raditya) to become an international badminton player. His father Tedjo (Mamiek Prakoso), who is a swan feather collector, ingredients to make shuttlecock, is a huge fan of Liem Swie King, an Indonesian badminton legend told his son the greatness of King. After his father told him about the story, Guntur determined to become a top international badminton player by joining a local badminton club, where he met his rival Arya Jonatan Christie. Until one day, when he and his rival, Arya invited to a selection process to join the biggest badminton club in Indonesia PB Djarum. During the selection, Arya failed it and has to go back home, when Guntur was selected to join the club. Two years later he won the Asian U-16 Badminton Championship.

Cast
Rangga Raditya as Guntur
Lucky Martin as Raden
Surya Saputra as Mr. Herman
Mamiek Prakoso as Tedjo, Guntur's father
Valerie Thomas as Michelle
Jonatan Christie as Arya
Kevin Sanjaya as himself
Aa Jimmy

References